Rhododendron davidsonianum, the concave-leaf rhododendron, is a species of flowering plant in the heath family Ericaceae that is native to the forests of Sichuan, China, where it lives at altitudes of . In Spring trusses of bell-shaped, pale pink or purple flowers are produced. 

In cultivation in the UK, Rhododendron davidsonianum has gained the Royal Horticultural Society’s Award of Garden Merit. Like most rhododendrons it prefers an acid soil.

References

davidsonianum